Gneiskopf Peak is a peak  high rising  southwest of Mount Neustruyev at the southern end of the Südliche Petermann Range, in the Wohlthat Mountains of Queen Maud Land, Antarctica. It was discovered and given the descriptive name Gneiskopf (gneiss peak) by the Third German Antarctic Expedition (1938–1939), led by Captain Alfred Ritscher.

See also
 List of mountains of Queen Maud Land

References

External links
 Scientific Committee on Antarctic Research (SCAR)

Mountains of Queen Maud Land
Princess Astrid Coast